The List of American Chemical Society national awards attempts to include national awards, medals and prized offered by the American Chemical Society (ACS). The ACS national awards program began in 1922 with the establishment of the Priestley Medal, the highest award offered by the ACS. As of 2016, the ACS offers a 64 national awards, medals and prizes based on scientific and professional contributions in chemistry. A category of ACS awards is available on Wikipedia.
The complete list of current awards is:

 ACS Award for Achievement in Research for the Teaching and Learning of Chemistry
 ACS Award for Affordable Green Chemistry
 ACS Award for Computers in Chemical and Pharmaceutical Research
 ACS Award for Creative Advances in Environmental Science and Technology
 ACS Award for Creative Invention
 ACS Award for Creative Work in Fluorine Chemistry
 ACS Award for Creative Work in Synthetic Organic Chemistry
 ACS Award for Distinguished Service in the Advancement of Inorganic Chemistry
 ACS Award for Encouraging Disadvantaged Students into Careers in the Chemical Sciences
 ACS Award for Encouraging Women into Careers in the Chemical Sciences
 ACS Award for Research at an Undergraduate Institution
 ACS Award for Team Innovation
 ACS Award in Analytical Chemistry
 ACS Award in Applied Polymer Science
 ACS Award in Chromatography
 ACS Award in Colloid Chemistry
 ACS Award in Industrial Chemistry
 ACS Award in Inorganic Chemistry
 ACS Award in Organometallic Chemistry
 ACS Award in Polymer Chemistry
 ACS Award in Pure Chemistry
 ACS Award in Separations Science and Technology
 ACS Award in Surface Chemistry
 ACS Award in the Chemistry of Materials
 ACS Award in Theoretical Chemistry
 Award for Volunteer Service to the American Chemical Society
 Roger Adams Award in Organic Chemistry
 Alfred Bader Award in Bioinorganic or Bioorganic Chemistry
 Earle B. Barnes Award for Leadership in Chemical Research Management
 Ronald Breslow Award for Achievement in Biomimetric Chemistry
 Herbert C. Brown Award for Creative Research in Synthetic Methods
 Alfred Burger Award in Medicinal Chemistry
 James Bryant Conant Award in High School Chemistry Teaching
 Arthur C. Cope Award
 Arthur C. Cope Scholar Awards (given for three distinct career levels)
 Elias J. Corey Award for Outstanding Original Contribution in Organic Synthesis by a Young Investigator
 F. Albert Cotton Award in Synthetic Inorganic Chemistry
 Peter Debye Award in Physical Chemistry
 Frank H. Field and Joe L. Franklin Award for Outstanding Achievement in Mass Spectrometry
 Francis P. Garvin - John M. Olin Medal
 James T. Grady - James H. Stack Award for Interpreting Chemistry for the Public
 Harry Gray Award for Creative Work in Inorganic Chemistry by a Young Investigator
 Ernest Guenther Award in the Chemistry of Natural Products
 Katheryn C. Hach Award for Entrepreneurial Success
 E. B. Hershberg Award for Important Discoveries in Medicinally Active Substances
 Joel Henry Hildebrand Award in the Theoretical and Experimental Chemistry of Liquids
 Ralph F. Hirschmann Award in Peptide Chemistry
 Ipatieff Prize
 Frederic Stanley Kipping Award in Silicon Chemistry
 Irving Langmuir Award in Chemical Physics (awarded in even-numbered years by ACS and in odd-numbered years by the American Physical Society)
 Josef Michl ACS Award in Photochemistry
 E. V. Murphree Award in Industrial and Engineering Chemistry
 Nakanishi Prize (awarded in odd-numbered years by ACS and in even-numbered years by the Chemical Society of Japan)
 Nobel Laureate Signature Award for Graduate Education in Chemistry
 James Flack Norris Award in Physical Organic Chemistry
 George A. Olah Award in Hydrocarbon or Petroleum Chemistry
 Charles Lathrop Parsons Award
 George C. Pimentel Award in Chemical Education
 Priestley Medal
 Glenn T. Seaborg Award for Nuclear Chemistry
 Gabor A. Somorjai Award for Creative Research in Catalysis
 George and Christine Sosnovsky Award for Cancer Research
 E. Bright Wilson Award in Spectroscopy
 Ahmed Zewail Award in Ultrafast Science and Technology

References

American Chemical Society